The 2016 Úrvalsdeild kvenna was the 45th season of the women's football top-level league in Iceland.

Stjarnan won the title and thus their fourth championship.

Standings

Top scorers
.

References

External links
 Official website
 Season on soccerway.com
 IcelandFootball.net - Ladies Competitions 2016 

1
2016
Icell
Icell